ASKY Airlines is a private multinational passenger airline serving West and Central Africa, with its head office in Lomé, Togo and its hub at Gnassingbé Eyadéma International Airport.

The airline is a strategic partner of Ethiopian Airlines, and has been consistently profitable since 2017.

History

Foundation
After the pan-African airline Air Afrique went bankrupt in 2002, cross-border air transport in Africa became more difficult, especially in West and Central Africa.  At a conference of the Economic Community of West African States (ECOWAS) and the West African Economic and Monetary Union (UEMOA) at Niamey in Niger on 10 January 2004, it was decided to create a private, competitive, cost-effective airline offering all guarantees of safety and security for the region.

In September 2005, under the initiative of Gervais Koffi G. Djondo, the company for the promotion of a regional airline (SPCAR) was set up, which led to various feasibility studies and market studies, and sought financial and strategic partners; this led to the establishment of ASKY Airlines in November 2007 with Gervais Koffi G. Djondo as President.  On 17 January 2008 the General Meeting to establish the new international private airline was held in Ouagadougou, Burkina Faso. 80% of shares were to be held by private investors, and 20% by public financial institutions whose mission is to support privately owned development institutions. Ethiopian Airlines became the technical and strategic partner under a management contract for the first five years of operation, holding a 40% stake.

Originally planned for April 2009, the first revenue flight took place on 15 January 2010.

Corporate affairs

Ownership
The airline is privately owned.  Main shareholders are Ethiopian Airlines (40%), Ecobank, BIDC, BOAD, Sakhumnotho Group Holding and other West and Central African private investors.

Business trends
Asky Airlines has been reported as being profitable, although accounts do not seem to have been published. The airline states that it was first profitable in 2015, and then again from 2017 to 2019.

Recent available figures (largely from AFRAA reports) are shown below (for years ending 31 December):

Destinations
Asky Airlines serves the following 19 scheduled destinations throughout West and Central Africa from its hub at Lome (October 2017):

Alliances and codeshare agreements
Asky is able to connect flights in its network to various points in the Ethiopian Airlines network, with whom it has codeshare arrangements, via Addis Ababa and beyond to the Middle East, Far East, and East Africa. In 2021, ASKY became a member of IATA.

Fleet

The ASKY Airlines fleet comprises the following aircraft as of April 2021:

ASKY was one of the first airlines in the world to operate dual-class Bombardier Dash 8 Q400 aircraft, with a completely separate cabin for business class passengers.

Accidents and incidents
 On 10 January 2015 an Asky Airlines Boeing 737-43QSF (leased from Ethiopian Airlines), was damaged beyond repair in a landing accident and runway excursion at Kotoka International Airport, Accra, Ghana. The aircraft was written off and there were no fatalities.

References

External links

 

Airlines of Togo
Airlines established in 2008
Ethiopian Airlines
Companies of Togo
Lomé
2008 establishments in Togo